The 2005 Australian Club World Championship Qualifying Tournament was as association football knock-out competition to determine the Australian entrant into the 2005 OFC Club Championship. The tournament consisted of seven teams, being the teams competing in the inaugural A-League season in 2005–06, with the exception of New Zealand Knights.

A standalone tournament was necessary to determine to determine Australia's Oceania Club Championship entrant for the year as there had yet to be any competitive matches for the new A-League clubs. It was to be a one-off competition, with Australia joining the Asian Football Confederation from 2006 onwards, and future continental qualification places determined by teams' performances in the A-League. The competition represented the first competitive matches of any kind for several of the teams. Perth Glory was given a bye in the first round as Champions of the final National Soccer League season.

Sydney FC won the tournament, defeating Central Coast Mariners 1–0 in the final. The final was scheduled to be held at Hindmarsh Stadium in Adelaide but was moved to Express Advocate Stadium in Gosford after two teams based in New South Wales qualified for the game.

Bracket

Matches

Quarterfinals

Semifinals

Final

Top scorers

References

External links
 [www.a-league.com.au Official A-League website]

2005 in Australian soccer